StudioCanal S.A.S. (formerly known as Le Studio Canal+, Canal Plus, Canal+ Distribution, Canal+ D.A., Canal+ Production, and Canal+ Image and also known as StudioCanal International) is a French film production and distribution  company that owns the third-largest film library in the world. The company is a unit of the Canal+ Group, owned by Vivendi.

Background 
The company was founded in 1988 by Pierre Lescure as a spin-off of the Canal+ pay-TV network. The original function was to focus on French and European productions, but later made strategic deals with American production companies, such as Carolco Pictures. StudioCanal's most notable productions from its early years include Terminator 2: Judgment Day, JFK, Basic Instinct, Cliffhanger, Under Siege, Free Willy, and the original Stargate movie. In those days, it was known as either Le Studio Canal+ or simply Canal+.

Other films the company financed include U-571, Bully, and Bridget Jones's Diary. StudioCanal also funded the last third of David Lynch's film Mulholland Drive. StudioCanal also financed French-language films, such as Brotherhood of the Wolf (which became the sixth-highest-grossing French-language film of all time in the United States) and Intimate Strangers (which is being remade by Hollywood-based Paramount Pictures). The biggest box office hits for StudioCanal have been Terminator 2: Judgment Day which grossed US$519 million, Basic Instinct which grossed US$352 million and The Tourist which grossed US$278 million worldwide.

Film library 
StudioCanal acquired film libraries from studios that either became defunct or had merged with it over the years; as a result, the company's library is one of the largest in the world, with over 6,000 titles.

StudioCanal owns the libraries of the following companies:
 Carolco Pictures, including:
 The Vista Organization
 Seven Arts (joint venture with New Line Cinema)
 Paravision International, including:
 Parafrance Films
 De Laurentiis Entertainment Group, including:
 Embassy Pictures
 Lumiere Pictures and Television (currently owned as a result of parent company Canal+ Group's acquisition of cinema operator UGC who acquired those companies, via Cannon Films), including:
 EMI Films, including:
 British Lion Films, including:
 Individual Pictures
 The 1947–1955 London Films library
 Anglo-Amalgamated, including:
 Anglo-Amalgamated Film Distributors
 Associated British Picture Corporation, including:
 ABC Weekend TV
 Associated British Productions
 British International Pictures
 Ealing Studios, including:
 Associated Talking Pictures and Associated British Film Distributors
 Pathé News
 Welwyn Studios
 Romulus Films
 Studio Ghibli (United Kingdom and the Republic of Ireland only, excluding Earwig and the Witch)
 Miramax (most international home video releases; 2011–2020, rights now held by Paramount Home Entertainment)
 Hammer Film Productions (distribution rights)
 Alexander Salkind/Pueblo Film Licensing (the non-Superman films not owned by Warner Bros.)
 Quad Cinema
 Regency Enterprises (TV rights only, France)
 Spyglass Entertainment (TV rights only, France, Benelux, Sweden and Poland)
 American Zoetrope (distribution rights)

Television series 
StudioCanal currently owns the rights to over 30 television series, mostly produced by TANDEM Productions and Red Production Company, including The Avengers, Rambo: The Force of Freedom, Paranoid, Public Eye, Crazyhead, Take Two, Wanted Dead or Alive, The Adventures of Paddington (2019), and international rights to The Big Valley.

Distribution

Acquisitions 
StudioCanal acquired British distributor Optimum Releasing in 2006 as their first expansion into an international market. A year later, Optimum Home Entertainment and Lionsgate UK acquired Elevation Sales, a home entertainment sales and distribution company. In 2008, their third expansion into the international market took place with StudioCanal's acquisition of German distributor Kinowelt, who had distributed their films up to that point. Kinowelt also owned the DVD label Arthaus. Both Optimum and Kinowelt have since been renamed StudioCanal. StudioCanal's acquisition of Australian distributor Hoyts Distribution took place in 2012 and was StudioCanal's fourth expansion.

In June 2016, StudioCanal acquired the intellectual rights to the Paddington Bear brand, along with the Copyrights Group, the franchise's merchandise licensing agent. StudioCanal then announced that it would be producing three more Paddington films, including a show  on Nick Jr. in 2020.

Distributors 
Outside France, the British Isles, Australia, New Zealand and Central Europe, StudioCanal does not have a formal distribution unit per se, instead relying on other distribution studios and home video distributors to handle their titles. In North America for example, The Criterion Collection, Rialto Pictures, Lionsgate Home Entertainment, Image Entertainment, Metro-Goldwyn-Mayer, Universal Pictures, Shout! Factory and Kino International distribute StudioCanal's back catalogue on DVD and Blu-ray Disc (in addition, Anchor Bay Entertainment previously owned several of their titles). Sony Pictures Home Entertainment has handled distribution of StudioCanal/Hoyts Distribution films in Australia and New Zealand on DVD and Blu-ray since early 2015.

In the 1990s to early 2000s, Warner Home Video formerly handled distribution of StudioCanal titles through the Canal+ Image label in the United Kingdom on VHS and DVD until 2006 when StudioCanal opened its own distribution unit in the UK, with titles distributed through Optimum Releasing.

StudioCanal had the European home video distribution rights to 550 titles from the Miramax library from 2011 to 2020, when Paramount Pictures bought a minority stake in Miramax.

Since January 2021, StudioCanal has been distributing Paramount Home Entertainment's releases and sales in the British Isles (including those of Miramax library) under its Elevation Sales joint-venture with Lionsgate UK, after Paramount's deal with Universal Pictures Home Entertainment ended.

On October 13, 2021, StudioCanal announced that its global distribution deal with Universal would expire in January 2022.

Selected films produced by StudioCanal or associated companies 

 The Doors (1991)
 Terminator 2: Judgment Day (1991)
 JFK (1991)
 The Mambo Kings (1992)
 Basic Instinct (1992)
 Universal Soldier (1992)
 Under Siege (1992) 
 Chaplin (1992)
 Sommersby (1993)
 Falling Down (1993)
 Cliffhanger (1993)
 Free Willy (1993)
 Stargate (1994)
 Free Willy 2: The Adventure Home (1995)
 U-571 (2000)
 O Brother, Where Art Thou? (2000) 
 Bridget Jones's Diary (2001)
 Paddington (2014)

References

External links 
 
Official history (archived); current version
List of film credits from Internet Movie Database

 
Film production companies of France
Mass media companies established in 1988
Film distributors of Australia
Film distributors of France
Film distributors of Germany
Groupe Canal+
International sales agents